Claude Kory Kondiano (1942 – 27 September 2022) was Guinean politician of the Rally of the Guinean People (RPG).

Biography
Married and a father of five children, Kondiano completed his secondary studies at the École Benedict Fribourg. He then studied at the institute of social sciences at Paris 1 Panthéon-Sorbonne University from 1966 to 1968 and at Sciences Po from 1970 to 1972.

Upon his return to Guinea, Kondiano held several administrative positions in the government from the 1980s to 2013, as well as working as a private consultant. From 13 January 2014 to 22 April 2020, he served as president of the National Assembly. He was also an advisor to President Alpha Condé from 20 June 2020 to 5 September 2021.

Claude Kory Kondiano died in Conakry on 27 September 2022.

References

1942 births
2022 deaths
Rally of the Guinean People politicians
Presidents of the National Assembly (Guinea)
Members of the National Assembly (Guinea)
Sciences Po alumni
People from Faranah Region